John Kyazze (born 1 February 1954) is a Ugandan weightlifter. He competed in the men's heavyweight II event at the 1984 Summer Olympics.

References

1954 births
Living people
Ugandan male weightlifters
Olympic weightlifters of Uganda
Weightlifters at the 1984 Summer Olympics
Place of birth missing (living people)
20th-century Ugandan people